Hazard Center station is a station on San Diego Trolley's Green Line. The street-level station has side platforms. It is located near the intersection of Hazard Center Drive at Frazee Road. The station is located across the street from the Hazard Center development and serves as a park and ride center, with spaces available in the lower portion of the adjacent garage. This stop is located in the densely populated Mission Valley West neighborhood.

Prior to July 2005, this station was served by the Blue Line until service between Old Town Transit Center and Mission San Diego was replaced by the Green Line upon its introduction in conjunction with the opening of the Mission Valley East extension.

Station layout
There are two tracks, each served by a side platform.

See also
 List of San Diego Trolley stations

References

Green Line (San Diego Trolley)
San Diego Trolley stations in San Diego
Railway stations in the United States opened in 1997
1997 establishments in California